Carla Diane Hayden (born August 10, 1952) is an American librarian and the 14th Librarian of Congress. Since the creation of the office of the Librarian of Congress in 1802, Hayden is both the first African American and the first woman to hold this post. Appointed in 2016, she is the first professional librarian to hold the post since 1974.

Born in Tallahassee, Florida, Hayden began her career at the Chicago Public Library, and earned a doctorate in library science from the University of Chicago. From 1993 until 2016, she was the CEO of Enoch Pratt Free Library in Baltimore, Maryland, and president of the American Library Association (ALA) from 2003 to 2004. During her presidency, she was the leading voice of the ALA in speaking out against provisions of the newly passed United States Patriot Act, which impacted public information services.

In 2020, she was elected to the American Philosophical Society.

Early life 
Hayden was born in Tallahassee, Florida, to Bruce Kennard Hayden Jr., at that time director of the String Department at Florida A&M University in Tallahassee, and Colleen Hayden, a social worker. Her parents met while attending Millikin University in Decatur, Illinois. Hayden grew up in Queens, New York. When she was 10 years old, her parents divorced and she moved with her mother to Chicago, Illinois. She had a younger half-brother from her father's second marriage, Bruce Kennard Hayden, III, who died in 1992.

Hayden's mother's side of the family comes from Helena, Arkansas. Her father's maternal side of the family, who eventually settled in Du Quoin, Illinois, had been enslaved, which is chronicled in the book, It's Good to Be Black, by Ruby Berkley Goodwin.

Hayden said that her passion for reading was inspired by Marguerite de Angeli's Bright April, the 1946 book about a young African-American girl who was in the Brownies. At Chicago's South Shore High School, Hayden became interested in books on British history and "cozy mysteries". She attended MacMurray College in Jacksonville, Illinois, and then transferred to Roosevelt University.

While she loved libraries she didn't consider it as a career until after she had graduated from Roosevelt University with majors in political science and African history in 1973. Hayden received her master's degree in Library Science in 1977, and a doctorate degree in Library Science in 1987, both from the University of Chicago Graduate Library School.

Career 

Hayden began her library career at the Chicago Public Library telling stories to children with autism. From 1973 to 1979, she worked as an Associate/Children's Librarian at the Whitney Young branch. From 1979 to 1982, she served as the Young Adult Services Coordinator. From 1982 to 1987,  Hayden worked as a Library Services Coordinator at Chicago's Museum of Science and Industry.

Hayden moved to Pittsburgh, where she was an associate professor, teaching at the University of Pittsburgh School of Information Sciences from 1987 to 1991. At the time, well known African-American librarians, E. J. Josey and Spencer Shaw, were on the faculty there.

Hayden then moved back to Chicago and became Deputy Commissioner and Chief Librarian of the Chicago Public Library, posts she held from 1991 to 1993. During her time working at the Chicago Public Library, Hayden became acquainted with Michelle Obama and Barack Obama.

From 1993 to 2016, Hayden was Executive Director of Baltimore's Enoch Pratt Free Library.

In January 2010, President Barack Obama announced his intent to nominate Hayden as a member of the National Museum and Library Services Board and National Foundation on the Arts and the Humanities.

Enoch Pratt Free Library 
On July 1, 1993, Hayden began the appointed position of Director at Enoch Pratt Free Library, the public library system in Baltimore, Maryland.

During her tenure, Hayden oversaw a library co-operative with 22 locations, hundreds of employees, and an annual budget of $40 million.  She also oversaw the first new branch opening in 35 years along with the renovation of the co-operative's central branch, at a cost of $112 million. During the 2015 protests of the death of Freddie Gray, Hayden kept Baltimore's libraries open, an act for which she received extensive praise.

When interviewed by American Libraries Magazine during the Baltimore unrest in 2015 why she decided to keep the libraries open, Hayden replied,

When later asked to reflect about the incident in a 2016 Time magazine interview she stated that the library became a command center of sorts as many stores in the community closed, and that "we knew that [people] would look for that place of refuge and relief and opportunity."

She left this position on August 11, 2016, when she was appointed to the Library of Congress.

ALA presidency 
As president of the American Library Association (ALA) from 2003 to 2004, Hayden chose the theme "Equity of Access". The term "Equity of Access” refers to idea that all people, from every background and of all ages, income, and capabilities, should have access to information they need in uncensored and varied formats (digital, print, etc.). On the topic of Equity of Access, Hayden has stated:

In her role as ALA President, Hayden was vocal in her public opposition to the Patriot Act, leading a battle for the protections of library users' privacy. She especially objected to the special permissions contained in Section 215 of that law, which gave the Justice Department and the FBI the power to access library user records. Hayden often sparred publicly with then-U.S. Attorney General John Ashcroft over the language of the law. Ashcroft often ridiculed the library community, and stated that the ALA had been "misled into opposing provisions of the act that make it easier for FBI agents to fish through library records". Hayden's response was immediate, stating that the ALA was "deeply concerned that the Attorney General would be so openly contemptuous" (to the library community), while also pointing out that librarians had been monitored and been under FBI surveillance as far back as the McCarthy Era. Hayden asserted that Ashcroft should release information as to the number of libraries that had been visited under the provisions of Section 215. She has stated that the concern stemmed from making sure that a balance existed "between security and personal freedoms."

As a result of her stand for the rights of every American, she became Ms. magazine's 2003 Woman of the Year. In her interview with the magazine, she stated:

Hayden says, "[Librarians] are activists, engaged in the social work aspect of librarianship. Now we are fighters for freedom".

Along with her objections of the Patriot Act, Hayden has done much in her career in outreach programs. As ALA President she wrote:

At a time when our public is challenged on multiple fronts, we need to recommit ourselves to the ideal of providing equal access to everyone, anywhere, anytime, and in any format ... By finally embracing equity of access we will be affirming our core values, recognizing realities, and assuring our future.

One program she is notable for is for the outreach program she began at the Enoch Pratt Free Library. This outreach program included "an after school center for Baltimore teens offering homework assistance and college and career counseling." Because of this, Hayden received Library Journal Librarian of the Year Award in 1995. She is the first African-American to have received this award.

Prior to and during her ALA presidency, Hayden also played a role in influencing the creation of the Spectrum Scholarship Program, which was first developed in 1997 and still offers yearly scholarships. This scholarship program seeks to "actively recruit and provide scholarships to American Indian/Alaska Native, Asian, Black/African American, Hispanic/Latino, Middle Eastern and North African, and/or Native Hawaiian/Other Pacific Islander students to assist them with obtaining a graduate degree and leadership positions within the profession and ALA". With this mission, the Spectrum Scholarship Program stands as a testament to the ALA's ongoing commitment to expand and improve diversity and inclusion within the field of librarianship.

14th Librarian of Congress 
On February 24, 2016, President Barack Obama nominated Hayden to serve as the next Librarian of Congress.  In a press release from the White House, President Obama stated:

Michelle and I have known Carla Hayden for a long time, since her days working at the Chicago Public Library, and I am proud to nominate her to lead our nation's oldest federal institution as our 14th Librarian of Congress. Hayden has devoted her career to modernizing libraries so that everyone can participate in today's digital culture. She has the proven experience, dedication, and deep knowledge of our nation's libraries to serve our country well and that's why I look forward to working with her in the months ahead. If confirmed, Hayden would be the first woman and the first African American to hold the position – both of which are long overdue.

After her nomination, more than 140 library, publishing, educational, and academic organizations signed a letter of support. The letter said in part that Congress had "an opportunity to equip the Library and the nation with the unique combination of professional skills and sensibilities that Dr. Hayden will bring to the post."

The nomination was received by the U.S. Senate and referred to the Committee on Rules and Administration. On April 20, 2016, the Committee on Rules and Administration, chaired by Senator Roy Blunt with Charles E. Schumer as ranking member, held the confirmation hearing. Hayden opposed the 2000 Children's Internet Protection Act (CIPA), which was a sticking point in her nomination to become Librarian of Congress.

On July 13, 2016, she was confirmed as Librarian of Congress by a 74–18 vote in the United States Senate. Hayden was sworn in by Chief Justice of the United States John Roberts on September 14, 2016.  Even though more than eighty percent of American librarians are women, for over two hundred years the position of Librarian of Congress was filled exclusively by white men, making Hayden the first woman and the first African American to hold the position. Notably, she is also a librarian by profession. Many past Librarians of Congress have been scholars and historians.

As Librarian of Congress, Hayden says she hopes to continue "the movement to open the treasure chest that is the Library of Congress." Hayden said much of her early effort will focus on building and retaining staff. In the next five years, Hayden will also focus on making sure that at least half of the library's 162 million items are digitized, especially rare collections. Hayden hopes for the library to have live performances and broadcasts and have traveling exhibits tour America that tie in with educational programming for schoolkids.

Hayden aspires to modernize the institution during her tenure by both preserving the collection and modernizing access to it, as she will be the first Librarian of Congress appointed "since the advent of the internet." In a press release by the ALA Washington Office, ALA President Julie Todaro said, "Hayden holds a profound understanding of the integral role libraries play in formal education, community-based learning, and the promotion of individual opportunity and community progress. I believe that through her visionary leadership the Library of Congress will soon mirror society's rapidly changing information environment, while successfully preserving the cultural record of the United States." She spoke of her desire to reach people outside of Washington, D.C., especially in rural areas and in accessible formats to people with visual disabilities. Another one of her main goals is to improve the infrastructure and "technological capacity" of the Library of Congress. She is undecided if the United States Copyright Office, which is overseen by the Library, should be independent of the Library, but believes the Office should be "fully functional" and be able carry to out its mandates to protect creators.

In January 2017, Hayden hosted 4-year old Daliyah Marie Arana as Librarian of Congress for the day.

Honors 
In 1995, Hayden was honored with the national Librarian of the Year Award by Library Journal, becoming the first African American to receive the prestigious award. Her commitment to equity of access was central to the honor.
 1995: Library Journal, Librarian of the Year Award
 1995: Loyola University Maryland, Andrew White Medal
 1996: DuBois Circle of Baltimore, Legacy of Literacy Award
 1998: Johns Hopkins University, President's Medal
 2003: The Daily Record, Maryland's Top 100 Women
 2003: Ms., Woman of the Year
 2006: American Library Association, Jean E. Coleman Library Outreach Lecture
 2013: American Library Association, Joseph W. Lippincott Award
 2015: American Library Association, Jean E. Coleman Library Outreach Lecture
 2016: Fortune, The World's 50 Greatest Leaders
 2017: Honorary degree from the College of William & Mary
 2017: American Library Association, Melvil Dewey Medal
 2017: Women's National Book Association, Centennial Award
 2017: Hurston/Wright Foundation, North Star Award
 2017: Time Magazine, Firsts Honoree
 2017: New York Public Library, Library Lion Honoree
 2017: W.E.B. Du Bois Medal from the Hutchins Center for African & African American Studies at Harvard University.
 2018: Honorary Member, American Library Association.
 Newberry Library Award for service to the humanities.
Coalition of 100 Black Women, Torch Bearer Award
 College of Notre Dame of Maryland, Pro Urbe Award
 Greater Baltimore Urban League, Whitney M. Young, Jr. Award
 YWCA Leader Award, Baltimore
 Barnard College Medal of Distinction
University of Baltimore, honorary degree of Doctor of Humane Letters
College of William & Mary, honorary degree of Doctor of Humane Letters
Morgan State University, honorary degree of Doctor of Humane Letters
McDaniel College, honorary degree of Doctor of Humane Letters
Wake Forest University, honorary degree of Doctor of Humane Letters
 2019: New York University, honorary degree of Doctor of Humane Letters
 2019: Golden Plate Award of the American Academy of Achievement presented by Awards Council member Dr. Ben Carson.
2022: Columbia University, honorary Doctor of Letters
2022: University of Pennsylvania, honorary Doctor of Humane Letters

Memberships 
 2015–2016: Baltimore Community Foundation, Trustee
 Maryland African American Museum Corporation, Board Member
 Goucher College, Board Member
 Franklin and Eleanor Roosevelt Institute and Library, Board Member
 Baltimore City Historical Society, Board Member
 Baltimore Reads, Board Member
 Maryland Historical Society, Board Member
 Greater Baltimore Cultural Alliance, Board Member
 Open Society Institute–Baltimore, Board Member
 PALINET, Board Member
 Sinai Hospital, Board Member
 University of Pittsburgh School of Information Sciences, Board Member
 2007– : Baltimore Gas and Electric, Board Member
 2010– : National Museum and Library Services Board, Member
 2010– : National Foundation on the Arts and the Humanities, Member
 Baltimore City Combined Charity Campaign, Chair
 American Institute of Urban Psychological Studies, Board Member
 Kennedy-Krieger Institute, Board Member
 Maryland Museum of African American History, Board Member
 YWCA, Board Member
 Urban Libraries Council, Board Member

Publications 

  – ALA Annual Conference, Sunday, June 28, 1992, 9 a.m.-5 p.m

Books 

  – 2nd revised edition builds upon this edition

Book Chapters

Selected articles 
 
 
 
 
 Hayden, C. D. (1991). Children and Computer Technology in American Libraries. Books by African-American authors and illustrators for children and young adults, 14.
 Hayden, C. D. (2003). ALA reaffirms core values, commitment to members. Newsletter On Intellectual Freedom, 52(6), 219.
 Hayden, C. D. (2003). Equity of Access—the Time Is Now. American Libraries, 34(7), 5.
 Hayden, C. D. (2003). ALA President's Message: Something for Everyone@ Your Library. American Libraries, 5–5.
 Hayden, C. D. (2003). ALA President's Message: What Are Libraries For?. American Libraries, 5–5.
 Hayden, C. D. (2004). ALA President's statement to Judiciary Committee. Newsletter On Intellectual Freedom, 53(1), 1–35.
 Hayden, C. D. (2004). ALA President's Message: The Equity Strule Must Continue. American Libraries, 5–5.
 Hayden, C. D. (2004). ALA President's Message: Libraries Matter Because People Believe in Them. American Libraries, 35(1), 5–5.
 Hayden, C. D. (2004). ALA President's Message: Advocacy from the Outside and from Within. American Libraries, 35(2), 5–5.
 Hayden, C. D. (2004). ALA President's Message: Reaching Out to the Underserved. American Libraries, 35(3), 5–5.
 Hayden, C. D. (2004). ALA President's Message: Building accessibility for all. American Libraries, 35(4), 5–5.
 Hayden, C. D. (2008). Free Is Our Middle Name. Unabashed Librarian, (146), 10–11.

Thesis/Dissertation

References

External links 
 Carla Hayden at Library of Congress
 
 

1952 births
African-American librarians
African-American women academics
American women academics
African-American academics
Librarians at the Library of Congress
Librarians of Congress
Living people
People from Baltimore
People from Tallahassee, Florida
Presidents of the American Library Association
Roosevelt University alumni
University of Chicago Graduate Library School alumni
University of Pittsburgh faculty
American librarians
American women librarians
Members of the American Philosophical Society